Pulmonary aspiration is the entry of material such as pharyngeal secretions, food or drink, or stomach contents from the oropharynx or gastrointestinal tract, into the larynx (voice box) and lower respiratory tract, the portions of the respiratory system from the trachea (windpipe) to the lungs. A person may inhale the material, or it may be delivered into the tracheobronchial tree during positive pressure ventilation. When pulmonary aspiration occurs during eating and drinking, the aspirated material is often colloquially referred to as "going down the wrong pipe".

Consequences of pulmonary aspiration range from no injury at all, to chemical pneumonitis or pneumonia, to death within minutes from asphyxiation. These consequences depend on the volume, chemical composition, particle size, and presence of infectious agents in the aspirated material, and on the underlying health status of the person.

In healthy people, aspiration of small quantities of material is common and rarely results in disease or injury. People with significant underlying disease or injury are at greater risk for developing respiratory complications following pulmonary aspiration, especially hospitalized patients, because of certain factors such as depressed level of consciousness and impaired airway defenses (gag reflex and respiratory tract antimicrobial defense system). The lumen of the right main bronchus is more vertical and slightly wider than that of the left, so aspirated material is more likely to end up in this bronchus or one of its subsequent bifurcations.

About 3.6 million cases of pulmonary aspiration or foreign body in the airway occurred in 2013.

Presentation

Consequences

Particle-related 
Pulmonary aspiration of particulate matter may result in acute airway obstruction which may rapidly lead to death from arterial hypoxemia.

Acid-related 
Pulmonary aspiration of acidic material (such as stomach acid) may produce an immediate primary injury caused by the chemical reaction of acid with lung parenchyma, and a later secondary injury as a result of the subsequent inflammatory response.

Bacterial 
Pulmonary aspiration may be followed by bacterial pneumonia. Community-acquired aspiration pneumonia is usually caused by anaerobic bacteria, whereas hospital-acquired aspiration pneumonia is more often caused by mixed flora, including both aerobic and anaerobic bacteria.

Death 

Pulmonary aspiration resulting in pneumonia, in some patients, particularly those with physical limitations, can be fatal. Famous people like John Bonham have died of it.

Risk factors 

Risk factors for pulmonary aspiration include conditions which depress the level of consciousness (such as traumatic brain injury, alcohol intoxication, drug overdose, and general anesthesia). A decreased gag reflex, upper esophageal sphincter and lower esophageal sphincter tone, gastroesophageal reflux, full stomach, as well as obesity, stroke, and pregnancy can all increase the risk of aspiration in the semiconscious. Tracheal intubation or presence of a gastric tube (for example, a feeding tube) may also increase the risk.

Prevention 
The lungs are normally protected against aspiration by a series of protective reflexes such as coughing and swallowing. Significant aspiration can only occur if the protective reflexes are absent or severely diminished (in neurological disease, coma, drug overdose, sedation or general anesthesia). In intensive care, sitting patients up reduces the risk of pulmonary aspiration and ventilator-associated pneumonia.

Measures to prevent aspiration depend on the situation and the patient. In patients at imminent risk of aspiration, tracheal intubation by a trained health professional provides the best protection. A simpler intervention that can be implemented is to lay the patient on their side in the recovery position (as taught in first aid and CPR classes), so that any vomitus produced by the patient will drain out their mouth instead of back down their pharynx. Some anesthetists will use sodium citrate to neutralize the stomach's low pH and metoclopramide or domperidone (pro-kinetic agents) to empty the stomach. In veterinary settings, emetics may be used to empty the stomach prior to sedation. Due to growing issues with patients not complying with fasting recommendations before surgery, some hospitals will now also routinely administer emetics prior to anesthesia. Newer operating rooms are often equipped with dedicated vomitoria for this purpose.

People with chronic neurological disorders, for example, after a stroke, are less likely to aspirate thickened fluids on an instrumental swallowing assessment.  However, this does not necessarily translate into reduced risk of pneumonia in real life eating and drinking. Also, pharyngeal residue is more common with very thickened fluids: this may subsequently be aspirated and lead to a more severe pneumonia.

The location of abscesses caused by aspiration depends on the position one is in. If one is sitting or standing up, the aspirate ends up in the posterior basal segment of the right lower lobe. If one is on one's back, it goes to the superior segment of the right lower lobe. If one is lying on the right side, it goes to the posterior segment of the right upper lobe, or the posterior basal segment of the right upper lobe. If one is lying on the left, it goes to the lingula.

See also 
 Drowning
 Mendelson's syndrome
 Salt water aspiration syndrome
 Choking
 Pharyngeal aspiration

References

Further reading

External links 

 Atlas of Pathology

Airway management
Anesthesia
Intensive care medicine
Lung disorders